The King Abdullah Sports City Stadium, previously known as the Prince Abdullah bin Abdul Aziz Stadium, is a football stadium in Buraidah, Saudi Arabia.  It is used mainly for football and hosts the home matches of Al Taawon and Al-Raed of the Saudi Professional League. The stadium has a seating capacity of 25,000 spectators.

The first official match played at the stadium was on 24 December 1982 between Al-Taawoun and Al-Tai in the 2nd week of the 1982–83 Saudi First Division. The match ended in a 1–1 draw, the first official goal scored in the stadium was an own goal by one of Al-Tai's defenders. The match saw an attendance of 10,000 people.

See also

 List of things named after Saudi Kings

References

External links
Stadium information
StadiumDB page

Football venues in Saudi Arabia
Buraidah